Transmiticate is the first album by the Los Angeles rock musician Donita Sparks' solo project Donita Sparks and The Stellar Moments, also featuring the former guitarist, singer and songwriter of punk rock band L7.

Track listing
All songs written by Donita Sparks

"Fly Feather Fly" – 4:58
"Dare Dare" – 2:33
"Infancy of a Disaster" – 3:17
"Headcheck" – 3:06
"My Skin's Too Thin" – 2:45
"Curtains for Cathy" – 3:03
"Creampuff" – 3:58
"He's Got the Honey" – 3:11
"Need to Numb" – 2:26
"Take a Few Steps" – 3:58
"Into the Hi-Fi" – 2:13

Personnel
 Donita Sparks – vocals, guitars, bass
 Alan Santalesa – guitars
 Demetra Plakas – drums, percussion
 Jesika von Rabbit – bass
 Dat Ngo – bass
 Ethan Allen – guitars, keyboards, synthesizer
 Kirk Canning – bass
 Jason Shapiro – guitars

2008 debut albums
Donita Sparks and the Stellar Moments albums